The All-Ireland Final may refer to:

 All-Ireland Hurling Final, the last match to be played in the All-Ireland Hurling Championship (Senior, Minor and Under-21 levels)
 The last match to be played in the All-Ireland Senior Football Championship
 The last match to be played in the All-Ireland Minor Football Championship
 The last match to be played in the All-Ireland Under-21 Football Championship
 The last match to be played in the All-Ireland Senior Ladies' Football Championship
 The last match to be played in the All-Ireland Junior Ladies' Football Championship
 The last match to be played in the All-Ireland Senior Camogie Championship

See also
 List of All-Ireland Fleadh champions